Baseball at the 2011 Pacific Games in Nouméa, New Caledonia was held on August 29–September 8, 2011.

Results

Participating teams

Preliminary round

Knockout stage

Bracket

Semifinals

Fifth place game

Small final

Final

References

Baseball at the 2011 Pacific Games

2011 Pacific Games
Pacific Games
2011